"Good Day" is the 27th single by Zard and released on December 2, 1998 under B-Gram Records label. It was released on same day as previous 26th single, Atarashii Door ~Fuyu no Himawari~. The single debuted at #2 on the first week. It charted for eight weeks and sold over 223,000 copies.

Track list
All songs are written by Izumi Sakai.
Good Day
composer: Masaaki Watanuki/arrangement: Daisuke Ikeda
Good Day (original karaoke)

References

1998 singles
Zard songs
Songs written by Izumi Sakai
1998 songs